Shahidulla, also spelt Xaidulla from Mandarin Chinese, (altitude ca. 3,646 m or 11,962 ft), was a nomad camping ground and historical caravan halting place in the Karakash River valley, close to Khotan, in the southwestern part of Xinjiang Autonomous Region, China. The site contains the ruins of a historical fort which was demolished by the Chinese administration of Xinjiang between 1890 and 1892. The site lies next to the Chinese National Highway G219 between Kashgar and Tibet, 25 km east of Mazar and 115 km west of Dahongliutan.

The modern town of Saitula is located next to the old fort of Suget Karaul built by the Chinese administration about 10 km (30 "Chinese miles") southeast of the original site. A modern People's Liberation Army barracks named Sanshili Yingfang or Sanshili Barracks is also located here. This name is a more common name used by motorists along the G219 highway.

Etymology
The Uyghur name Shahidulla simply means "witness of Allah" or "martyr of Allah" depending on the interpretation of the heteronym "shahid".

During the 1800s, the place was a sepulcher or shrine for a person known as Shahidulla Khoja, or Shahid Ullah Khajeh.
He was said to be a Khoja from Yarkand who was killed by "his Khitay pursuers" during the 1700s Qing conquest of Xinjiang. His real name was lost. At the time local Kirghiz nomads venerated the shrine and Muslim travellers would pray for blessing on their journey.

Geography and caravan trade

Shahidulla is situated between the Kunlun mountains and the Karakoram range, "close to the southern foot of the former". It is at the western bend of the Karakash River, which originates in the Aksai Chin plains, flows northeast and makes a sharp bend to the west at the foot of the Kunlun range. After making another bend near Shahidulla, it flows northeast again, cutting through the Kunlun mountains towards Khotan.

Caravaners talk about a "southern branch" of the Kunlun range at the foot of which the Karakash flows, and a "northern branch" (also called the "Kilian range") which has various passes (from the west to east, Yangi, Kilik, Kilian, Sanju, Hindu-tagh and Ilchi passes). The Kilian and Sanju passes are the most often mentioned, which lead to Kashgar.

To the south of Shahidulla, the trade route passed through the site of Suget Karaul (the modern 'Saitula' town), ascended the valley of a stream to the Suget Pass and, after crossing a junction point of Ak-tagh, went over the Karakoram Pass into Ladakh. An alternative route to Ladakh from Shahidulla (called the "Chang Chenmo route") went along the Karakash river till reaching the Aksai Chin plains and then to Ladakh via the Chang Chenmo valley. This route was never really popular with the traders, despite the best efforts of the British Raj to promote it.

The entire area between the Karakoram range and the Kunlun mountains is mostly uninhabited and has very little vegetation, except for the river valleys of Yarkand and Karakash. In these valleys, during the summer months, cultivation was possible. Kanjutis from Hunza used to cultivate in the Yarkand valley (called "Raskam" plots) and the Kirghiz from Turkestan used to cultivate in the area of Shahidullah. Shahidullah is described as a "seasonal township" in the sources, but it was little more than a campground in the 19th century.

Kulbhushan Warikoo states that, of the two trade routes between Central Asia and the Indian subcontinent, one in the west through Chitral and the Pamirs, and the other in the east through Shahidulla and Ladakh, the eastern route was more favoured by the traders as it was relatively safe from robberies and political turmoil:

The absence of turmoil was not a given. In fact, the traders applied pressure on the rulers to avoid conflict. The Ladakhi rulers especially heeded such warnings, dependent as they were on trade for their prosperity.

History
There is legendary and documentary evidence that indicates that Indians from Taxila and the Chinese were among the first settlers of Khotan. In the first century BC, Kashmir and Khotan on the two sides of the Karakoram range formed a joint kingdom, which was ruled by either Scythian or Turki (Elighur) chiefs. Towards the end of the first century AD, the kingdom broke up into two parts: Khotan being annexed by the Chinese and Kashmir by Kanishka.

Some modern scholars believe the Kingdom of Zihe in Chinese historical records was situated at Shahidulla. This is not universally attested.

16th century
In late 15th century, Mirza Abu Bakr Dughlat from the Dughlat tribe founded an independent kingdom for himself from the fragmentation of Moghulistan. The kingdom encompassed Hotan and Kashgar. However, he was deposed in the 1510s by Sultan Said Khan who founded the Yarkand Khanate. While attempting to flee to Ladakh, Abu Bakr was intercepted and killed.

19th century

In the nineteenth century, Shahidulla became the centre of a multi-pronged game between Kashmir, the British Empire in India, China, Kashgaria and the Russian Empire.

About 120 Kirghiz nomad families lived in Shahidulla in forty tents. Their head-man was called Turdi Kul. The British regarded the Kirghiz as Chinese subjects and believed that they "always" paid taxes to Yarkand. Yet there is evidence that this may not have occurred till 1881, and the Chinese considered them to be living beyond their boundaries.
The Kirghiz faced periodic raids from the Kanjutis of Hunza, who controlled the Yarkand River valley (called "Raskam") and had protection from China. They also carried off people and sold them into slavery.

The Dogra ruler of Jammu, Raja Gulab Singh, then a vassal of the Sikh Empire, conquered Ladakh in 1834. According to Francis Younghusband, all the area up to Shahidulla was immediately taken under control by the Dogras. This was of no consequence to the Chinese in Turkestan (present day Xinjiang) as they viewed the northern Kunlun range as their border.  In 1846, Gulab Singh came under the suzerainty of the British as the Maharaja of Jammu and Kashmir. The British were inclined to view the Karakoram range as the natural boundary of the Indian subcontinent and they viewed the Maharaja's claim to Shahidulla with trepidation.

This left the tract between the Karakoram and Kunlun ranges as a no-man's land. Since regular trade caravans passed through the area, which were open to robber raids, securing it became important to the new Dogra regime in Kashmir. A fort at Shahidulla was apparently constructed by the Dogras at an uncertain date.
George Hayward later described it as 'a stone fort and several ruined huts'.
Around 1864, when the Chinese authority in Turkestan was overthrown by the Kokand chieftain Yakub Beg, the Dogra governor of Ladakh stationed a garrison of troops at the fort. Described as a chauki (police post), it had a contingent of 25 men including customs officials. The post was abandoned in 1866, apparently due to the difficulty of maintaining it at a great distance. In 1868, Robert Shaw and Hayward found it occupied by Kokandi troops.

In the interim, in 1865, the British surveyor W. H. Johnson, tasked with surveying the Ladakhi territory "up to Chinese frontiers", received an invitation for a visit from the Khan of Khotan named Haji Habibullah. Johnson spent a few weeks in Khotan and returned via Sanju Pass and Shahidulla. The border of Ladakh he drew was along the northern Kunlun range (on which the Kilian and Sanju passes lay), and included the Karakash valley within Ladakh.

By 1873, Douglas Forsyth was dispatched by the British on a diplomatic mission to Yakub Beg. The Forsyth Mission recognised Shahidullah as part of the "Khan's dominion", and placed the boundary between British Empire and Turkestan at Ak-tagh, south of the Suget Pass. (See Map 1) From this point on, the British officials began to reject Dogra claims to Shahidulla.

In 1877, Yakub Beg died and the Chinese reasserted their authority in Turkestan (renaming it as Xinjiang—"new dominion"). They however stuck to their original posts (karawals) on the north side of the Kilian and Sanju passes, and showed no interest in occupying Shahidulla. As late as 1889, the Turdi Kol reported that Chinese officials told him that Shahidulla was "British territory".

In 1889, Francis Younghusband, who was tasked with finding measures to counteract a potential Russian aggression in the area, proposed that the Chinese be encouraged to occupy all the no man's land between the British and Russian territories and serve as a buffer zone. This was agreed by the British administration, and the British envoy in Peking was instructed to discuss the matter with the Chinese government. Simultaneously, Younghusband was sent on a second mission to Yarkand to "induce" the Chinese officials to expand and fill out the no man's land.
The means he used to induce them are not precisely known, but by the end of his mission, the Chinese officials showed a firm commitment to occupy Shahidulla, and even all the area up to the Karakoram Pass.
It appears that they stationed troops at the Shahidulla fort during the summer months of 1890, but withdrew them during winter. Further in 1892, they knocked down the Shahidulla fort and built a new fort at Suget Karaul, about 10 km. southeast of Shahidulla, where the road from Suget Pass enters the Karakash Valley. Younghusband reported that the Chinese were asserting authority all the way to the Karakoram range, and the site was said to be the closest place to the range where grass and fuel were available.

20th and 21st centuries

By the early 20th century, the Shahidullah region was under Chinese control and considered part of Xinjiang Province, and has remained so ever since. Xaidulla is well to the north of any territories claimed by either India or Pakistan, while the Sanju and Kilian passes are further to the north of Xaidulla. A Sinkiang–Tibet road (or "Aksai Chin road", now part of G219) was laid by China in the 1950s, which runs from Yecheng in the Tarim Basin, south through Xaidulla, and across the Aksai Chin region, controlled by China but claimed by India, into northwestern Tibet.

Current status
Some time after the construction of the road, Chinese administration built a village at Suget Karaul and named it "Saitula".  The nomad population of the former Shahidula apparently took up residence in the new village. In May 2010, Saitula was made a township.

The township includes one village, which was formerly part of Kangir Kirghiz Township:

 Sarikia, also called Ilinagar. . It is in the Karakash River valley to the north of Shahidulla at the base of the route to the Sanju Pass. A hamlet called Ali Nazar is also in its vicinity, where Yakub Beg is said to have a built a fort.

Transportation
China National Highway 219 passes through the town of Saitula as well as the historical Shahidullah site. A mountain road runs from the historical site to the town of Sanju in the Tarim basin via the Sanju Pass.

Notes

References

Bibliography
 
 . For a downloadable early draft of this book see the Silk Road Seattle website hosted by the University of Washington at: https://depts.washington.edu/silkroad/texts/texts.html
 
 
 
 
 
 
 
 
 . File downloadable from:

Further reading
National Geographic Atlas of China (2008). National Geographic Society, Washington, D.C. .

Sites along the Silk Road
Populated places in Xinjiang
Hotan Prefecture
Township-level divisions of Xinjiang